East Ayton is a village and civil parish in the Scarborough 
district of North Yorkshire, England.

According to the 2011 UK census, East Ayton parish had a population of 1,678, a reduction on the 2001 UK census figure of 1,687.

Forge Valley C.C., the local cricket club for East & West Ayton, were the national Village Cup champions in 1986, winning the competition at Lord's.

Notable people
John Fendley, aka Fenners of Soccer AM fame, grew up in the village and was a pupil at Raincliffe School.

Gavin Williamson, MP and former Secretary of State for Defence was raised in East Ayton and attended the local primary school.

References

External links

Villages in North Yorkshire
Civil parishes in North Yorkshire